Kalanchoe × poincarei is a species of Kalanchoe native to southern Madagascar. Its scientific name is often misapplied to K. suarezensis and K. mortagei, but K. × poincarei  is very different from them. The true K. × poincarei is a natural hybrid involving K. beauverdii, with similar sprawling stems up to 3 m in length, and not known in cultivation, whereas K. suarezensis and K. mortagei are erect, 30~60 cm tall and cultivated as ornamentals.

References 

x poincarei
x poincarei
Endemic flora of Madagascar
Hybrid plants